Clay Sampson (born 24 February 1976) is a former Australian rules footballer who played in the Australian Football League (AFL) and the South Australian National Football League (SANFL). Sampson debuted for South Adelaide in 1994 before being drafted and going on to play 64 AFL games at three AFL clubs.

He returned to South Adelaide in 2001, before officially retiring in 2008. He was appointed Assistant Coach at the start of the 2008 season, before being thrust into the head coaching position, when John "Jack" Cahill resigned midway through the season. Sampson was appointed until the end of the 2009 season, finishing with a 4–28 win–loss record.

Sampson now coaches Myponga-Sellicks Football Club in the Great Southern Football League.

Career
Melbourne: 1995–96, 13 games, 1 goal.
Adelaide: 1997–98, 24 games, 16 goals.
Richmond: 1999–2000, 27 games, 18 goals.
South Adelaide Football Club

Statistics

|-
|- style="background-color: #EAEAEA"
! scope="row" style="text-align:center" | 1995
|style="text-align:center;"|
| 24 || 5 || 0 || 3 || 11 || 9 || 20 || 4 || 2 || 0.0 || 0.6 || 2.2 || 1.8 || 4.0 || 0.8 || 0.4
|-
! scope="row" style="text-align:center" | 1996
|style="text-align:center;"|
| 24 || 8 || 1 || 1 || 30 || 18 || 48 || 7 || 6 || 0.1 || 0.1 || 3.8 || 2.3 || 6.0 || 0.9 || 0.8
|- style="background-color: #EAEAEA"
|style="text-align:center;background:#afe6ba;"|1997†
|style="text-align:center;"|
| 24 || 10 || 5 || 5 || 69 || 25 || 94 || 17 || 17 || 0.5 || 0.5 || 6.9 || 2.5 || 9.4 || 1.7 || 1.7
|-
! scope="row" style="text-align:center" | 1998
|style="text-align:center;"|
| 24 || 14 || 11 || 7 || 89 || 34 || 123 || 18 || 25 || 0.8 || 0.5 || 6.4 || 2.4 || 8.8 || 1.3 || 1.8
|- style="background-color: #EAEAEA"
! scope="row" style="text-align:center" | 1999
|style="text-align:center;"|
| 26 || 17 || 14 || 12 || 137 || 35 || 172 || 35 || 32 || 0.8 || 0.7 || 8.1 || 2.1 || 10.1 || 2.1 || 1.9
|-
! scope="row" style="text-align:center" | 2000
|style="text-align:center;"|
| 24 || 10 || 4 || 5 || 54 || 12 || 66 || 11 || 10 || 0.4 || 0.5 || 5.4 || 1.2 || 6.6 || 1.1 || 1.0
|- class="sortbottom"
! colspan=3| Career
! 64
! 35
! 33
! 390
! 133
! 523
! 92
! 92
! 0.5
! 0.5
! 6.1
! 2.1
! 8.2
! 1.4
! 1.4
|}

Player honours
 1997 Premiership player with Adelaide
 2003–2006 South Adelaide captain
 2001 South Adelaide leading goalkicker

References

External links

Melbourne Football Club players
Adelaide Football Club players
Adelaide Football Club Premiership players
Richmond Football Club players
South Adelaide Football Club players
South Adelaide Football Club coaches
Australian rules footballers from South Australia
1976 births
Living people
One-time VFL/AFL Premiership players